Henry Hadley may refer to:
 Henry Kimball Hadley (1871–1937), American composer and conductor
 Henry Hadley (died 1914) (1863–1914), English civilian, the "first British casualty" of World War I
 Henry Hamilton Hadley (1826–1864), American theologian
 Red Hadley (Henry Hadley), Negro league baseball player